The Columbia metropolitan area is the region centered around the City of Columbia in the U.S. state of Missouri. Located in Mid-Missouri, it consists of five counties: Boone, Audrain, Randolph, Cooper, and Howard. The population was estimated at 256,640 in 2017, making it the 4th largest metropolitan area in Missouri. Columbia is home to the University of Missouri, and is Missouri's fourth most-populous and fastest growing city, with an estimated 121,717 residents as of 2017. Other significant cities in the area include Moberly, Mexico, Boonville, Vandalia, Centralia, and Fayette.

The area was originally called the Boonslick and settled mainly by Kentuckians following the Boone's Lick Road starting around 1812. The town of Franklin, now washed into the Missouri River, was an early commercial center and start of the Santa Fe Trail. Columbia was founded as county seat of Boone County in 1821. Today, Interstate 70, and U.S. Highways 63, 54, 24, and 40 link the urban areas. The U.S. Census defines the Columbia MSA as Boone, Cooper, and Howard counties while the addition of Audrain and Randolph form the combined statistical area.

Counties

Current
Boone (central county)
Audrain
Randolph
Cooper
Howard

Incorporated places

Cities with greater than 100,000 inhabitants
Columbia (principal city), 123,195

Cities with greater than 10,000 inhabitants
Moberly, 13,974
Mexico, 11,543

Towns with greater than 1,000 inhabitants
Boonville, 7,964
Ashland, 4,747
Centralia, 4,136
Vandalia (partial), 3,899 (~2,000 are inmates at a local prison)
Fayette, 2,695
Huntsville, 1,564
Hallsville, 1,614
Glasgow, 1,087

Towns with greater than 100 inhabitants
Sturgeon, 872
Higbee, 568
Laddonia, 513
Farber, 322
Martinsburg, 304
Clark, 298
Cairo, 292
Harrisburg, 266
Rocheport, 239
Renick, 172
Rush Hill, 151
Jacksonville, 151
Clifton Hill, 114
Benton City, 104
Hartsburg, 103

Villages
Vandiver, 77
Pierpont, 76
Huntsdale, 31
McBaine, 10

Unincorporated places
Shaw
Thompson
Two Mile Prairie
Midway

Demographics
As of the census of 2000, there were 145,666 people, 56,930 households, and 34,010 families residing within the MSA. The racial makeup of the MSA was 85.83% White, 8.42% African American, 0.41% Native American, 2.76% Asian, 0.03% Pacific Islander, 0.67% from other races, and 1.87% from two or more races. Hispanic or Latino of any race were 1.72% of the population.

The median income for a household in the MSA was $34,550, and the median income for a family was $45,689. Males had a median income of $29,837 versus $22,970 for females. The per capita income for the MSA was $17,521.

See also
Missouri census statistical areas
List of cities in Missouri
List of villages in Missouri

References

 
Metropolitan areas of Missouri